John Strong Perry Tatlock (February 24, 1876 – June 24, 1948) – known as J. S. P. Tatlock – was an American literary scholar and medievalist.

Biography
Tatlock was born in Stamford, Connecticut, in February 1876, the son of Florence (Perry) and The Rev. William Tatlock. He attended Harvard University, receiving his Bachelor of Arts degree in 1896 and his Ph.D. in 1903.  He began his academic career at the University of Michigan (1897-1916).  He later joined the faculties of Stanford University (1915-1925), Harvard (1925-1929), and the University of California, Berkeley (1929-1946).  He specialized in the literature of medieval Britain, focusing especially on the works of Geoffrey Chaucer and Geoffrey of Monmouth. His works include The Development and Chronology of Chaucer's Works, The Modern Reader's Chaucer, The Siege of Troy in Elizabethan Literature, and A Concordance to the Complete Works of Geoffrey Chaucer and to the Romaunt of the Rose.  The book for which he is chiefly remembered is his posthumously published study of Geoffrey of Monmouth, The Legendary History of Britain.

Family
Tatlock's daughter, Jean Tatlock (1914–1944), was an American psychiatrist, writer, and a member of the American Communist Party who became known for her romantic relationship with Manhattan Project scientific leader J. Robert Oppenheimer.

References

1876 births
1948 deaths
Writers from Stamford, Connecticut
Harvard University alumni
University of California, Berkeley faculty
University of Michigan faculty
American literary historians
American male non-fiction writers
Chaucer scholars
American medievalists
Scholars of Latin literature
Arthurian scholars
American academics of English literature
Fellows of the Medieval Academy of America
Historians from California
Historians from Connecticut
Presidents of the Modern Language Association